Child's Dance is an album by drummer Art Blakey and The Jazz Messengers recorded in 1972 and released on the Prestige label.

Reception

Scott Yanow of Allmusic stated, "After several years of few recordings, Art Blakey's Jazz Messengers re-emerged with totally new personnel on this Prestige LP... An interesting set".

Track listing 
All compositions by Stanley Clarke except where noted.
 "C.C." – 12:18
 "Child's Dance (Christian's Song)" (Ramon Morris) – 7:40       
 "Song for a Lonely Woman" – 9:40    
 "I Can't Get Started" (Vernon Duke, Ira Gershwin) – 7:30

Recorded at Van Gelder Studios in Englewood Cliffs New Jersey on May 23 (track 3) and July 8 (tracks 1, 2 & 4), 1972

Personnel 
Art Blakey – drums
Woody Shaw – trumpet (tracks 1, 2 & 4)
Buddy Terry – soprano saxophone (track 3)
Ramon Morris – tenor saxophone (tracks 1 & 2), flute (track 3)
Manny Boyd - flute (track 2)
George Cables – piano, electric piano (tracks 1, 2 & 4)
John Hicks – electric piano (track 3)
Mickey Bass (track 3), Stanley Clarke (tracks 1, 2 & 4) – bass
Ray Mantilla (tracks 1, 2 & 4), Emanuel Rahim (track 3) – congas 
Nathaniel Bettis, Richie "Pablo" Landrum, Sonny Morgan – percussion (track 3)

References 

Art Blakey albums
The Jazz Messengers albums
1972 albums
Prestige Records albums
Albums produced by Ozzie Cadena
Albums recorded at Van Gelder Studio